Mrtník is a municipality and village in Plzeň-North District in the Plzeň Region of the Czech Republic. It has about 300 inhabitants.

History
The first written mention of Mrtník is from 1420.

References

Villages in Plzeň-North District